Kirurumi is a Sub-location in Kenya's Central Province, Tetu constituency, its current sub-chief is Daniel Kihumba King'ori(2009-) The major economic activity is dairy farming, subsistence farming is also done thanks to fertile lands and good climate.

References 

Populated places in Central Province (Kenya)